The Ministry of Constitutional Affairs is a ministry responsible for the constitution in Somalia. The current Minister of constitutional affairs is Abdirahman Hoosh Jibril.

See also
 Agriculture in Somalia

References

External links
Ministry of Constitutional Affairs | Government of Somalia , Constitutional Affairs

Constitutional Affairs
Ministries established in 2012
2012 establishments in Somalia